Clark School is a private school in Rowley, Massachusetts, United States. The Lower School was founded in 1978 and the High School was founded in 2006. Although they do not have their own sports teams, they are part of Triton Athletics. They have a theater program and a tech program that offer hands on experience for their students. Dan Hall is a history teacher at Clark high school, he is notable for his many creative projects.  The school itself is quite old and was founded by the Clark family. In 2019 Clark had a 40th anniversary.

References

 

1978 establishments in Massachusetts
Educational institutions established in 1978
Private elementary schools in Massachusetts
Private middle schools in Massachusetts
Private high schools in Massachusetts
Buildings and structures in Rowley, Massachusetts
Schools in Essex County, Massachusetts